Museo Civico may refer to:

Abruzzo
 Museo civico aufidenate Antonio De Nino, Alfedena
 Museo civico aufidenate, Castel di Sangro
 Museo civico di Cerchio
 
 Museo civico archeologico Antonio De Nino, Corfinio
 Basilio Cascella Civic Museum, Pescara
 Museo Civico di Teramo

Calabria

Campania
 , Ariano Irpino
 , Cerreto Sannita

 Museo Civico di Castel Nuovo, Naples
 Museo Civico Filangieri, Naples
 Museo Civico Raffaele Marocco, Piedimonte Matese

Emilia-Romagna
 Civico Museo Bibliografico Musicale (now the Museo internazionale e biblioteca della musica), Bologna
 Museo Civico Archeologico di Bologna
 Giardino Botanico del Museo Civico di Scienze Naturali di Faenza
 Musei Civici di Arte Antica e Museo Riminaldi, Ferrara
 Civic museums of Forlì
 Civic Museum of Mirandola

Friuli-Venezia Giulia
 
 Civico Museo di Storia Naturale di Trieste
 Museo Civico Revoltella, Trieste

Lazio
 
 
 
 
 Museo Civico di Rieti
 Museo Civico di Zoologia, Rome

Liguria
 Museo Civico di Storia Naturale di Genova
 Museo civico Amedeo Lia, La Spezia

Lombardy
 Museo Civico Archeologico di Arsago Seprio
 Museo Civico Scienze Naturali Enrico Caffi, Bergamo
 Civic Museum of Fossils of Besano
 
 Civic Museum of Crema
 Museo Civico Ala Ponzone, Cremona
 
 
 , Mantua
 Museo Civico di Storia Naturale di Milano
 
 Museo Civico, Pavia
 
 , Varese

Marche
 Musei Civici di Palazzo Pianetti, Jesi
 Civic Museum and Pinacoteca, Mondavio
 
 
 Civic Museum of Palazzo Mosca, Pesaro
 Museo civico Villa Colloredo Mels, Recanati

Molise

Piedmont
 Federico Eusebio Civic Museum of Archaeology and Natural Sciences, Alba
 
 
 Museo Civico Casa Cavassa, Saluzzo
 
 Museo Civico d'Arte Antica, Turin

Puglia

Sardinia

Sicily
 , Caltagirone
 , Paternò
 Museo civico al Castello Ursino, Catania
 Museo Civico Belliniano, Catania

Tuscany
 Museo Civico di Montepulciano
 
 Museo Civico, Pistoia
 
 
 
 
 Museo Civico di Sansepolcro
 Museo Civico, Siena

Trentino-Alto Adige
 
 
 Museo Civico di Merano

Umbria

Veneto
 Museo Civico di Bassano
 
 
 Musei Civici di Padova
 
 Fondazione Musei Civici di Venezia
 Burano Lace Museum
 Ca' Pesaro
 Ca' Rezzonico
 Carlo Goldoni's House
 Doge's Palace
 Murano Glass Museum
 Museo Correr
 Museo di Palazzo Mocenigo
 Museo di Storia Naturale di Venezia
 Palazzo Fortuny
 St Mark's Clocktower
 Musei Civici di Verona
 
 Castelvecchio Museum
 
 
 
 
 
 
 Museo Civico, Vicenza

See also
 Guelph Civic Museum, Guelph, Ontario, Canada
 City Museum (disambiguation)